Daniel Kalla is a Canadian author and physician.  He has written several popular novels in the thriller and historical fiction genres, all with medical themes.  He was the director of Emergency Medicine at St. Paul's Hospital in Vancouver, British Columbia.

Both Kalla's father and grandfather were also practicing physicians; his grandfather fled Czechoslovakia weeks prior to the Nazi annexation of that country in 1939.  Kalla was born in Vancouver on May 4, 1966. He attended the University of British Columbia, where he studied math as an undergraduate, and received his M.D.  He also took a screenwriting course at Simon Fraser University, which encouraged his writing ambitions.  His first novel, Pandemic, was inspired by his experiences screening potential SARS patients in Vancouver during the 2003 outbreak. He went on to head the Emergency Medicine departments at two Vancouver hospitals. He is an Associate Clinical Professor at the University of British Columbia. As of 2016, he has published nine novels with two publishers, Tor and HarperCollins. He has used a recurring character, Dr. Franz Adler, in three of his novels.

Bibliography 
 Pandemic, Tor, 2005
 Resistance, Tor, 2006
 Rage Therapy, Tor, 2006
 Blood Lies, Forge (Tor) 2008
 Cold Plague, Forge (Tor), 2008
 Of Flesh and Blood, Forge (Tor), 2010
 The Far Side of the Sky, HarperCollins
 Rising Sun, Falling Shadow, HarperCollins, 2013
 Nightfall Over Shanghai, HarperCollins 2015
 We All Fall Down, Simon and Schuster, 2019 
 Lost Immunity, Simon and Schuster, 2021

References 

Canadian male novelists
Canadian emergency physicians
University of British Columbia alumni
Academic staff of the University of British Columbia
Writers from Vancouver
Living people
1966 births
21st-century Canadian novelists
21st-century Canadian male writers